Contraband Love is a 1931 British crime film directed by Sidney Morgan and starring C. Aubrey Smith, Janice Adair and Haddon Mason. It was made at British and Dominions Elstree Studios and on location in Cornwall. The film was distributed by the American studio Paramount Pictures as a quota quickie.

Cast
 C. Aubrey Smith as Paul Machin, JP  
 Janice Adair as Janice Machin  
 Haddon Mason as Roger  
 Rosalinde Fuller as Belle Sterling  
 Sydney Seaward as Sampson  
 Charles Paton as Jude Sterling  
 Marie Ault as Sarah Sterling

References

Bibliography
Chibnall, Steve. Quota Quickies: The Birth of the British 'B' Film. British Film Institute, 2007.
 Low, Rachael. Filmmaking in 1930s Britain. George Allen & Unwin, 1985.
 Wood, Linda. British Films, 1927-1939. British Film Institute, 1986.

External links

1931 films
Films directed by Sidney Morgan
1931 crime films
British crime films
Films shot at Imperial Studios, Elstree
Paramount Pictures films
Films set in England
Films shot in Cornwall
Quota quickies
British black-and-white films
1930s English-language films
1930s British films